Abu Hail is a rapid transit station on the Green Line of the Dubai Metro in Dubai, UAE, serving the Hor Al Anz areas in Deira. The district of Abu Hail itself is north of Hor Al Anz.

The station opened as part of the Green Line on 9 September 2011. It is close to the eponymous Abu Hail Center and the Pearl Wisdom School Dubai. The station is also close to a number of bus routes.

References

External links
 

Railway stations in the United Arab Emirates opened in 2011
Dubai Metro stations